In physics, in the area of quantum information theory and quantum computation, quantum steering is a special kind of nonlocal correlation, which is intermediate between Bell nonlocality and quantum entanglement. A state exhibiting Bell nonlocality must also exhibit quantum steering, a state exhibiting quantum steering must also exhibit quantum entanglement. But for mixed quantum states, there exist examples which lie between these different quantum correlation sets. The notion was initially proposed by Schrödinger, and later made popular by Howard M. Wiseman, S. J. Jones, and A. C. Doherty.

Definition 
After running the experiment many times, they will obtain measurement statistics , this is just the symmetric scenario for nonlocal correlation. Quantum steering introduces some asymmetry between two parties, viz., Bob's measurement devices are trusted, he knows what measurement his device carried out, meanwhile, Alice's devices are untrusted. Bob's goal is to determine if Alice influences his states in a quantum mechanical way or just using some of her prior knowledge of his partial states and by some classical means. The classical way of Alice is known as the local hidden states model which is an extension of the local variable model for Bell nonlocality and also a restriction for separable states model for quantum entanglement.

Mathematically, consider Alice having the measurement assemblage , where the elements  make up a POVM and the set  are the outcomes of observable . Similar as in the case of quantum entanglement, to define entangled states, we must define the unentangled states (separable states). A state is called a steering state if it is not un-steerable.

Local hidden state model 
Let us do some comparison among Bell nonlocality, quantum steering, and quantum entanglement. By definition, a Bell nonlocal which does not admit a local hidden variable model for some measurement setting, a quantum steering state is a state which does not admit a local hidden state model for some measurement assemblage and state assemblage, and quantum entangled state is a state which is not separable. They share a great similarity.

 local hidden variable model  
 local hidden state model 
 separable state model

References 

Quantum information theory